53 Wood Street is a grade II listed house at Wood Street, Chipping Barnet. The house dates from the early 1800s and has a distinctive central porch with four ionic columns.

References

External links

Houses in the London Borough of Barnet
Grade II listed buildings in the London Borough of Barnet
Wood Street, Chipping Barnet